The Battle of Tianmenling, or the Battle of Cheonmun-ryeong in Korean, was a battle fought between Dae Jo-yeong, later founder of Balhae, and Li Kaigu, a Khitan commander of the Chinese Tang dynasty and Wu Zhou dynasty.

After the fall of korean kingdom of Goguryeo to the Silla-Tang armies, Dae Jo-yeong, along with his father Dae Jung-sang, were forced to move over into the Yingzhou province of Tang. In the confusion of the Khitan uprising (led by Li Jinzhong and Sun Wanrong) against the Zhou in May 696, Dae Jung-sang and the Baishan Mohe leader Geolsa Biu sought independence from Zhou. In spite of Empress Wu Zetian's appeasement policy, they fled eastward to the former land of Goguryeo.

The Zhou sent general Li Kaigu to give chase, and subsequently Geolsa Biu and Dae Jung-sang were killed. Dae Jo-yeong integrated the Goguryeo people under the two leaders and resisted the Tang's attack. He scored a victory over the Zhou at the Battle of Tianmenling, which enabled him to establish his own kingdom. Dae jo yeong claimed himself the King of Jin in 699 and put his capital at Dongmo Mountain, in the south of today's Jilin province.

External links
  대조영과 이해고의 숙명을 건 천문령 전투, 부산일보
 HISTORICAL DEVELOPMENT OF THE PRE-DYNASTIC KHITAN

Tianmenling 698
690s conflicts
698
7th century in China
Balhae